The Andrew Thompson Farmstead is one of three Registered Historic Places associated with the eponymous family along NY 302 in Thompson Ridge, an unincorporated section of the Town of Crawford in Orange County, New York.

It was built around 1810 in a combination of two popular styles in early America: Greek Revival and the Federal style. It remains largely intact

It was added to the National Register of Historic Places in 2005.

References

Houses on the National Register of Historic Places in New York (state)
Houses in Orange County, New York
National Register of Historic Places in Orange County, New York
Houses completed in 1810